The 1922 Idaho Vandals football team represented the University of Idaho in the 1922 college football season. Idaho was led by first-year head coach Robert L. Mathews in their first season as a member of the Pacific Coast Conference. One home game was played on campus in Moscow at MacLean Field, with one in Boise at Public School Field.

They dropped an eighth consecutive game to Washington State in the Battle of the Palouse, but it was the only loss to the Cougars under Mathews. Idaho won the next three meetings, their only three-peat in the rivalry series.

Schedule

 The Little Brown Stein trophy for the Montana game debuted sixteen years later in 1938
 One game was played on Friday (in Moscow against Washington State)and one was played on Thursday (at Montana in Missoula on Thanksgiving)

References

External links
Oregon game program
Go Mighty Vandals – 1922 football season
Idaho Argonaut – student newspaper – 1922 editions

Idaho
Idaho Vandals football seasons
Idaho Vandals football